G-mik is a Philippine youth-oriented television show produced by ABS-CBN, and was aired on February 13, 1999, replacing Gimik, both of which were directed by Laurenti Dyogi. Starred by some of ABS-CBN Talent Center's (now Star Magic) finest young artists, G-mik is one of the most successful youth-oriented program aired in the Philippine television. The original cast includes Camille Prats, Angelica Panganiban, John Prats, Carlo Aquino, Stefano Mori, and Miko Samson. After the show's first book, new artists were introduced namely, Heart Evangelista, Danilo Barrios, Janus del Prado, Bernard Cardona, Angelene Aguilar, and Abigail Cruz. Later on, the show was ended on June 1, 2002, and was replaced by K2BU.

The series is currently streaming on Jeepney TV YouTube Channel every 4:00pm.

Plot
Book 1
It all started with the four friends Yuan (John Prats), Borj (Stefano Mori), Roni (Camille Prats), and Jelai (Angelica Panganiban) who live in one neighborhood together. Until they were joined by these two boys, Jun-Jun (Carlo Aquino) and Tonsy (Miko Samson) who just moved in the same village as the other four. They began to be friends and hang-out together. They went through a lot of problems together, from Borj and Tonsy fighting because they both like Roni, to Jelai and Jun-Jun began to be best of friends as days pass. Their parents also got along with each other and trust their kids to hang-out and look for each other. Surely, they are one barkada we will never forget.
Books 2–4
Borj is jealous to Roni's first crush and childhood friend Basti who happens to become his frenemy to win Roni's heart. Yuan happens to meet Missy in billiard and fall in love with her, Yuan's "miracle Tonsy" was accused of courting Missy on Yuan's back. So Yuan and Tonsy didn't talk for a while but later on Yuan finally realized that nothing is going on between the two. Yuan was always jealous of Tonsy going to Missy's house. Jun-Jun met Epoy who helped him get his first job. Jun-Jun asked Epoy that if he needed any help, he's willing to help out. Epoy asked him if he can hook him up with Jelai, which made Jun-Jun jumped because at that time Jelai and him were together. They kept it secret to Epoy until he found out and backed away. Bea Aguilar, new girl on campus when she came in, Tonsy fall for her immediately when she asked him where is the locker. Then Borj came in the picture and what Bea and Borj didn't know is that they were both the kids who lit the candle in the church when they were young. Now that Bea got in a serious accident, Borj is more in her heart.

Cast

Original cast (Book 1)
 Camille Prats as Ronalisa "Roni" Salcedo – Younger siblings of Yuan and Alex, she has a crush on her brother's best friend Borj, but when Basti comes to her house to visit Roni's father and realizes she still has feelings for him since their young.
 Angelica Panganiban as Angelica "Jelai" Rivera – She treats Roni as her sister since she's an only child. She a crush on her best friend, Jun-Jun.
 John Prats as Juanito "Yuan" Salcedo – He is the overprotective siblings of Alex and Roni and even had a fight her sister when he found out that Borj and Tonsy like Roni and he tried to separate them from her sister. He likes Missy since he first saw her in billiard place. Now they are the sweetest couple in the group.
 Carlo Aquino as Justin "Jun-Jun" dela Cruz - Best friend of Tonsy and Jelai who is also his crush. He tries to make the group out of trouble especially Yuan and Borj.
 Stefano Mori as Benjamin "Borj" Jimenez – At first, he and Tonsy were rivals for Roni's heart but when Tonsy gave up, Basti came to the picture who happens to be Roni's first crush and childhood friend while new friend Alex. He then meet Bea, the new girl in campus he and Tonsy again became rivals to Bea's heart they both didn't know is that they were both the kids who lit the candle in the church when they were young. Now that Bea got in a serious accident, Borj is more in her heart.
 Miko Samson as Antonio "Tonsy" Rodriguez – Jun-Jun's best friend. He and Borj were rivals, but he knew that Roni did like Borj more than him and so he just stopped on courting Roni. He gave her a notebook that has poems and he said that that was his proof that he does not have any feelings for her anymore. Yuan, Borj and also his best friend start to become his enemy when he helped Jelai to run away from home, but soon they rekindled their friendship. And like his friend Jun-Jun he helped Borj and Yuan especially when they're in trouble and again when the minute he saw Bea it was love at first sight then Borj came in the picture.

Additional cast (Books 2–4)
 Anne Curtis as Apple — She is the girlfriend of Tonsy
 Heart Evangelista as Missy Sandejas – Was seen by Yuan in a billiard place when he, Jun-Jun, Kuya Paks, and Yuan's cousin went to have fun. So Yuan did like Missy from the start. Now they are the sweetest couple in the group.
 Danilo Barrios as Sebastian "Basti" Barrios – Came in the group just to ask if Roni's parents if they can cater for his prom because he is the head of it. His parents couldn't do the job because they were busy. From then on he became a semi-regular in G-mik. Also as one of Roni's suitor besides Borj.
 Janus Del Prado as Leopoldo "Epoy" Prado – He liked Jelai and asked Jun-Jun to help him get close to her, but he found out that Jelai and Jun-Jun were together he became part of the group.
 Angelene Aguilar as Bea Aguilar – Plays the new girl on campus when she came in. Tonsy immediately fall for her when she ask where the lockers were. Right now they have a pretty good relationship with each other.
 Abigail Cruz as Jane Martinez – Is as sporty, adventurous, and even boyish as Borj.

Supporting cast
 William Martinez as Charlie Salcedo (Roni and Yuan's father)
 Yayo Aguila as Marite Salcedo (Roni and Yuan's mother)
 John Arcilla as Cesar Rivera (Jelai's father)
 Malou de Guzman as Yaya Medel (Jelai's nanny)
 Noel Trinidad as Lolo Miyong (Borj's grandfather)
 Marita Zobel as Lola Seling (Borj's grandmother)
 Joji Isla as Roger dela Cruz (Jun-Jun's father)
 Ces Quesada as Elsie dela Cruz (Jun-Jun's mother)
 Miguel de la Rosa as Paquito "Paks" dela Cruz (Jun-Jun's brother)
 Monina Bagatsing as Cherry dela Cruz (Jun-Jun's sister)
 Don Laurel as Jerry (Roni and Yuan's cousin)
 Angela Velez as Marla (Jelai's stepmother)
 Lovely Rivero as Emily (Jelai's biological mother)
 Doods Peralejo as Niko (Marla's son and Jelai's stepbrother)
Kaye Abad as Cassandra "Kakai" Marquez
John Lloyd Cruz as Junie de Dios
Desiree del Valle as Dette Zubiri
Kristopher Peralta as Teofilo "Toffee" Sanchez

Recurring cast
 Robert Seña as Tonsy's father
 Teresa Loyzaga as Tonsy's mother
 Melissa Avelino as Mia (Tonsy's semi-serious girlfriend)
 Berting Labra† as Mang Carding (Roni and Yuan's uncle)
 Beverly Salviejo as Tiya Mariana (Roni and Yuan's aunt)
 Princess Schuck as Sunshine (Borj's admirer and Roni and Yuan's cousin)
 Allyzon Lualhati as Nelia (Roni and Jelai's classmate and has feelings for Yuan)
 Michael Roy Jornales as Bryan (Basti's friend and Jelai's suitor)
 Ching Arellano† as high school teacher (G-mik barkada's close teacher)
 Sherilyn Reyes as high school teacher (G-mik barkada's close teacher)
 Laura James as Trisha (Borj's first girlfriend)
 Ray Ventura† as Mang Delfin (school bus driver)
 Ian Galliguez as high school principal
 Jon Santos as Uncle B.
 Giselle Sanchez as Aling Anne 
 Rodney Shattara as Rodney (Basti's friend)
 Pascal Greco as Francois (Aling Anne's nephew)
 Noel Colet as Ric (Basti's father and Yuan's godfather)
 CJ Tolentino as Andrew (Missy's brother)
 Bernard Cardona as Alexander Alex Salcedo (Yuan's and Roni's siblings)
 Maegan Miller as Katya (cheerleader)
 Onemig Bondoc as Lt. Paolo Mendrez (Missy's crush)
 Anna Larrucea as Leslie (Borj's second girlfriend)
 Ricci Chan as talent scout

Guest Cast
Kaye Abad as Cassandra "Kakai" Marquez (from Gimik)
Kristopher Peralta as Teofilo "Toffee" Sanchez (from Gimik)
John Lloyd Cruz as Junie de Dios (from Gimik)
Desiree del Valle as Dette Zubiri (from Gimik)
Bella Flores† as Lola Rosa (became close to Yuan and she sees her deceased son from him)
Bernard Palanca as RJ Sebastian
Carding Castro† as Yaya Medel's brother
Cris Daluz† as old garbage collector
Empress Schuck as young orphan (went to Tonsy's grandmother's house together with the other orphans for a Christmas party prepared by the G-mik barkada)
Ernie Zarate as Lolo Sebyong
Gloria Macapagal Arroyo as Tonsy's grandmother
 Joanna Isidro as Myla Andres (G-mik barkada's schoolmate)
Mar Garchitorena as Lolo Juancho
Mo Twister as Jelai's crush
Ramon Zamora† as Mr. Lim (Bryan's father)
Ricky Rivero as Mark 
Sarah Christophers as Carolina "Carol" Dionisio (crossover episode with Ang Munting Paraiso)
Audrey Vizcarra as Matet (Kuya Paks' girlfriend)
Crystal Gayle Valencia as Marga (Yuan's childhood crush)

Rerun
From March 16, 2014, to August 23, 2015, G-mik had back-to-back rerun episodes on Jeepney TV (every Sunday afternoon from 1:00 p.m. to 3:00 p.m.).

See also
 List of programs broadcast by ABS-CBN

References

External links
 

ABS-CBN drama series
ABS-CBN original programming
Philippine teen drama television series
1999 Philippine television series debuts
2002 Philippine television series endings
1990s Philippine television series
Filipino-language television shows
Television shows set in the Philippines
Television series about teenagers